Joe or Joseph Perez may refer to:

Joseph Pérez (1931–2020), French historian
Joe Perez (writer) (born 1969), American author of books on spiritual development
Joseph Patrick Pérez (born 1997), American soccer player
Joe Perez (baseball) (born 1999), American third baseman

See also
Joseph Pérès (1890–1962), French mathematician